Thioredoxin domain-containing protein 12 is a protein that in humans is encoded by the TXNDC12 gene.

TXNDC12 belongs to the thioredoxin superfamily (see TXN; MIM 187700). Members of this superfamily possess a thioredoxin fold with a consensus active-site sequence (CxxC) and have roles in redox regulation, defense against oxidative stress, refolding of disulfide-containing proteins, and regulation of transcription factors (Liu et al., 2003).[supplied by OMIM]

References

Further reading

Endoplasmic reticulum resident proteins